Absolute Hangover is a 1999 Norwegian comedy film directed by Petter Næss, starring Ingar Helge Gimle and Brit Elisabeth Haagensli.

Plot
John and Siri Lill are around forty and have been together for most of their lives, without getting married. When John's drinking gets out of hand, Siri Lill decides to move back with her parents. John goes on a drunken binge, and just as the apartment is in a terrible mess, Siri Lill decides to return. Things to badly.

References

External links
 
 Absolutt blåmandag at Filmweb.no (Norwegian)

1999 films
1999 comedy films
Films directed by Petter Næss
Norwegian comedy films